Fire Services Act may refer to:
 Fire Services Act 1947 of the Parliament of the United Kingdom
 Fire Services Act 1951 of the Parliament of the United Kingdom
 Fire Services Act 1959 of the Parliament of the United Kingdom